St Joseph's Convent School, Kalpetta was established in 1973 and is administered by the Bethany Educational Society Mangalore, a Christian Religious Minority Institution. The Bethany Educational Society registered under the Societies Registration Act of 1860 with Reg.No.17 of 1948–49.

All the members of the Bethany Educational Society are Catholic nuns belonging to the congregation of the sisters of the Little Flower of Bethany. They admit students irrespective of caste, creed and religion. The school is affiliated to C.B.S.E. Delhi.

References

External links
 School Page on BES Mangalore

Christian schools in Karnataka
Schools in Mangalore
Educational institutions established in 1973
1973 establishments in Karnataka